Spiral was a collective of African-American artists initially formed by Romare Bearden, Charles Alston, Norman Lewis, and Hale Woodruff on July 5, 1963. It has since become the name of an exhibition, Spiral: Perspectives on an African-American Art Collective.

History
Active from the summer of 1963 through 1965, the group of artists met weekly to discuss the role of African-American artists in politics and the civil rights movement, as well as in the larger art world, and organized one group exhibition.

The group was initiated after artists Romare Bearden and Hale Woodruff invited other artists to discussions in Bearden's loft. Initially the group was concerned with logistical issues, such as obtaining buses to travel to the March on Washington in the summer of 1963. Soon afterward, their efforts turned toward aesthetic concerns, including what author Ralph Ellison called a "new visual order." The members of the group were at varying stages in their careers when they first started meeting. While they did agree that their place, as artists, in the civil rights movement was important, they had differing views on what that place would be. The artists in the group were moved to come together and discuss their own engagement in the struggle for civil rights, even though each found engagement in a different way. The collective allowed for a shared response to the courage that defined the struggle for civil rights.

In the years leading up to the formation of Spiral, most of the artists were doing figurative work. Several started to experiment with abstraction as they grew as artists and began working more closely together. Bearden expressed the want of collaborating on a collage. But because the group used different techniques and mediums in their works, they decided that there would be other ways to impact the movement. Although the group was active for only a short time, Spiral proved to be important as an historical initiative, and was one of the first artist groups to call for the cultural community's involvement in social change.

The group's only exhibition was May 14 through June 5, 1965, titled First Group Showing: Works in Black and White. The exhibition was in part a response to the trend of major art institutions to overlook the work of African-American artists. Bearden had suggested the exhibition's black-and-white theme because it comprised both socio-political and formal concerns.

The Spiral group was relatively ignored in much traditional art history since its demise. But interest in the group was rekindled by a group exhibition of the collective in Birmingham and New York in 2010-2011, and the associated catalogs. The exhibition looks at the way the Spiral collective came into its own during a period of American history full of unrest, and the varied visual responses of African-American artists.

Artists
Romare Bearden - collages, watercolors, oils, and prints
Hale Woodruff - murals, paintings, prints
Norman Lewis - painter
Charles Alston - painter, sculptor, illustrator, and teacher
Emma Amos - painter, mixed media
Calvin Douglass - painter
Perry Ferguson - painter
Reginald Gammon - oil paints, watercolors, drawings, and prints
Felrath Hines - abstract expressionism
Alvin Hollingsworth - comics, paints
William Majors - drawing, painting, paper collages, 3D canvases
Richard Mayhew - painter
Earl Miller - painting, pencil drawings
Merton Simpson-abstract paintings
James Yeargans - painter

Name
Woodruff suggested the name "spiral" in reference to the Archimedean spiral that "moves outward embracing all directions, yet continually upward". The name also represented the diversity of styles and interests represented by the work of the members as they "sought to move toward common goals as individual artists and as African-American people".

Exhibitions
Spiral: Perspectives on an African-American Art Collective was on view at the Birmingham Museum of Art from December 5, 2010 through April 17, 2011. It was organized by Emily G. Hanna and Amalia Amaki.
The exhibition was on view at the Studio Museum in Harlem, July 14 through October 23, 2011. Spiral: American Masters was on view at Evolve the Gallery (accompanied by a full catalog) from April 12 through May 24, 2014.

References

External links
Perspective on an African-American Art Collective at the Birmingham Museum of Art
 Studio Museum Harlem
Art Topics: “Romare Bearden and SPIRAL” 2010.

Reviews
 The Village Voice reviews the exhibition
The Sacrament Bee reviews Spiral: American Masters

American artist groups and collectives
African-American art
African-American arts organizations
Arts organizations established in 1963
1963 establishments in the United States